= Litteratura Serpentium =

European herpetological magazine

Litteratura Serpentium is a herpetological magazine published by the European Snake Society in Dutch since 1980 (ISSN 0926-3586;ISSN 1571-9006), and in English since 1983.(ISSN 0926-3527)

It was previously published bi-monthly, but its frequency switched to quarterly.
